Gross & Co. (GKH) is an Israeli law firm, specializing in the fields of securities, mergers and acquisitions (M&A), hi-tech, corporate law and cross border activity. GKH is ranked as one of the top law firms in Israel, Legal 500 and Chambers Global. The firm's staff consists of some 220 professionals, many of whom are members of foreign bar association and have extensive work experience abroad – in the US, Europe, Australia, Brazil and more.

Practice areas
GKH specializes in various fields of law including corporate, mergers and acquisitions, capital markets, securities, technology, banking, project finance, litigation, antitrust, energy and infrastructure, environmental law, intellectual property, labor law and tax.

The firm represents public companies traded in the U.S., Israel and Europe, banks, insurance companies and pension funds. GKH also represents private companies of all sizes, start-ups, partnerships and ventures. GKH's clients engage in the fields of: energy and infrastructure, high technology, venture capital, industry, commerce, banking, financial and service enterprises, insurance companies, pension funds, hedge funds, life sciences and telecommunications.

References

External links
 

Law firms established in 1979
Law firms of Israel